Badminton has been one of the regular Asian Games sports since 1962 in Jakarta, Indonesia.

History
Badminton made its debut in the Asian Games as a demonstration sport at the 1958 Asian Games in Tokyo, Japan, and became a regular competitive sport in 1962. In the 1962 Games, six events were held, with singles, doubles and team event for both men and women. The mixed doubles event was added in 1966 Asian Games. There was a playoff between the two semifinal losers to determine the sole winner of the bronze medal in 1962; but since 1966, two bronze medals per event are awarded in each event (except in 1974).

Competition
Asian Games badminton consists of a single-elimination tournament. Each match is played to the best of three games, each game is of 21 points. Rally scoring is used, meaning a player does not need to be serving to score. A player must win by two points or be the first player to 30 points.

Editions

Events

Medal table

Performance by nations

Participating nations

Finals

Men's singles

Men's doubles

Men's team

Women's singles

Women's doubles

Women's team

Mixed doubles

List of medalists

References

External links
BAC: Asian Games
Doha 2006: Medalists from previous Asian Games
Sports123: Asian Games badminton 

 
Sports at the Asian Games
Asian Games